The Fujifilm FinePix S602 zoom is a digital camera manufactured by Fujifilm. It is part of their FinePix S-series range. It is a compact digital camera, although it does resemble a digital SLR. First released in 2002  the S602 zoom camera has now been discontinued by Fujifilm.

Specification
Below is the specification for the Fujifilm FinePix S602 Zoom

References

S602